POPmail was an early e-mail client written at the University of Minnesota. The original version was a Hypercard stack that acted as a Post Office Protocol client. Later versions of POPmail were written as normal Macintosh applications, and a PC version of POPmail was also released. POPmail and Eudora were both instrumental in moving higher education e-mail use away from terminal-based user interfaces and into a client–server GUI metaphor.

Searches of USENET news from the late 1980s to the early 1990s illustrate the early adoption of TCP/IP-based mail clients, and the increasing popularity of this approach in the early 1990s.

References

Classic Mac OS email clients